Dafydd ap Rhys O Fenai was a 16th-century Welsh poet from the Abergavenny area. Only one of his poems (written in praise of God) is known to survive.

References 

16th-century Welsh poets
Welsh male poets